CSCB may refer to:
 Coin Street Community Builders, a development trust and social enterprise based in London, England
 The Syndicalist Confederation of Intercultural Communities of Bolivia, a Bolivian farmers' union formerly known as the Syndicalist Confederation of Colonizers of Bolivia